Sherri Allen Lydon (born February 21, 1962) is a United States district judge of the United States District Court for the District of South Carolina. She previously served as the United States Attorney for the same district. She was the first woman to serve as a presidentially-appointed U.S. Attorney for the District of South Carolina.

Education 

Lydon earned her Bachelor of Arts from Clemson University and her Juris Doctor from the University of South Carolina School of Law.

Career 

Lydon began her legal career at Nexsen Pruet Jacobs and Pollard. Three years later, she became an assistant United States attorney for the District of South Carolina. As a federal prosecutor, she carried a diverse docket, including public corruption, RICO, drug, and fraud cases.

U.S. attorney 

On April 10, 2018, President Donald Trump announced his intent to nominate Lydon to serve as United States attorney for the District of South Carolina. On April 12, 2018, her nomination was sent to the Senate. On May 10, 2018, her nomination was reported out of committee by a voice vote. On May 22, 2018, the Senate confirmed her nomination by voice vote. She was sworn into office on May 24, 2018. She left office on December 10, 2019, after becoming a federal judge.

Lydon was the first female U.S. attorney for the District of South Carolina to be appointed by a president.

Federal judicial service 

On September 12, 2019, President Donald Trump announced his intent to nominate Lydon to serve as a United States district judge of the United States District Court for the District of South Carolina. On October 15, 2019, her nomination was sent to the Senate. President Trump nominated Lydon to the seat vacated by Judge A. Marvin Quattlebaum Jr., who was elevated to the United States Court of Appeals for the Fourth Circuit on September 4, 2018. On October 16, 2019, a hearing on her nomination was held before the Senate Judiciary Committee. On November 7, 2019, her nomination was reported out of committee by a 18–4 vote. On December 4, 2019, the United States Senate invoked cloture on her nomination by a 79–14 vote. On December 5, 2019, her nomination was confirmed by a 76–13 vote. She received her judicial commission on December 10, 2019.

References

External links 
 
 

|-

1962 births
Living people
20th-century American lawyers
21st-century American lawyers
21st-century American judges
Assistant United States Attorneys
Judges of the United States District Court for the District of South Carolina
People from Myrtle Beach, South Carolina
South Carolina lawyers
Trump administration personnel
United States Attorneys for the District of South Carolina
United States district court judges appointed by Donald Trump
University of South Carolina School of Law alumni
20th-century American women lawyers
21st-century American women lawyers
21st-century American women judges